AZD-5423 is a nonsteroidal glucocorticoid and phase II experimental drug being developed by AstraZeneca and disclosed at the spring 2013 American Chemical Society meeting in New Orleans to treat respiratory diseases and in particular chronic obstructive pulmonary disease.

It has completed a phase II clinical trial.

See also
 Dagrocorat
 Fosdagrocorat
 Mapracorat

References

External links
 AZD-5423 - AdisInsight

Phenylethanolamine ethers
Glucocorticoids
Indazoles
Trifluoromethyl compounds
Respiratory agents
Acetamides
Fluoroarenes